David Round (born 25 June 1978) is a former Australian rules footballer who played with the Western Bulldogs in the Australian Football League (AFL).

Round, the son of former Brownlow Medal winner Barry, was drafted by the Western Bulldogs under the father–son rule. He was recruited from the Calder Cannons and before that played at Strathmore. A ruckman, he was aged 18 when he made his AFL debut in round three of the 1997 AFL season, against Richmond at the MCG. He could only manage one kick but kept his spot in the side for the following week's fixture against Melbourne. Round again struggled to have an impact, with just two hit-outs and a solitary kick.

Having been delisted at the end of the season, Round was rookie listed by North Melbourne. However, he did not play a senior game and ended up at Victorian Football League (VFL) club Williamstown, another of his father's former clubs. In 1999 he won Williamstown's "best and fairest" award but by 2001 was spending a lot of time in the reserves. He performed so well in the 2001 VFL reserves competition that he took home the Todd Medal, as the league's best player.

In 2002 he moved to Queensland to join Southport and was a Grogan Medal winner in his first season. He won another Grogan Medal in 2005, this time while at Broadbeach.

References

1978 births
Australian rules footballers from Victoria (Australia)
Western Bulldogs players
Williamstown Football Club players
Southport Australian Football Club players
Broadbeach Australian Football Club players
Calder Cannons players
Strathmore Football Club players
Living people